Namrole is a district (kecamatan) on the southern coast of Buru Island, Indonesia. It is the seat of South Buru Regency.

The district is mostly rural and subdivided into 17 villages, having a population of just over 20,000 people as of 2020. The district town itself is located at the southern coast of the district, on a bay. The district is served by the Namrole Airport.

References

Buru
Regency seats of Maluku (province)